Ellington Airport  is a city-owned public-use airport located three miles (5 km) north of the central business district of Lewisburg, a city in Marshall County, Tennessee, United States.

Although most U.S. airports use the same three-letter location identifier for the FAA and IATA, Ellington Airport is assigned LUG by the FAA but has no designation from the IATA (which assigned LUG to Agno Airport in Lugano, Switzerland).

Facilities and aircraft 
For the 12-month period ending July 23, 1998, the airport had 17,050 aircraft operations, an average of 46 per day: 91% general aviation, 9% air taxi and <1% military. At that time there were 33 aircraft based at this airport: 79% single-engine, 18% multi-engine and 3% ultralight.

References

External links 
 ELLINGTON - LUG at Tennessee DOT
 

Airports in Tennessee
Buildings and structures in Marshall County, Tennessee
Transportation in Marshall County, Tennessee